Pontokomi is a village located in the central part of Kozani regional unit, West Macedonia region, Greece. It is part of the municipal unit Dimitrios Ypsilantis. It is situated between the cities of Ptolemaida and Kozani ( distance from each).

It is a refugee town, developed as a modern and organised village with a complete market and services.  A new amphitheatre opened 15 July 2001 which was constructed at the foot of the mountain and shaped by former quarries. On 20 June 2002, it was named Amphitheatre Mikis Theodorakis.

Pontokomi is notable in later Greek history including the participation of the majority of residents in the resistance during World War, and also in marching against dictatorship.

The main industry is agriculture (cereals and tobacco) and some residents work in the power stations.

References

External links
Pontokomi-Our  village  around the world Ποντοκώμη- Το χωριό μας σε όλο τον κόσμο
Association of Environment and life quality   Pontokomis Σύλλογος Περιβάλλοντος και ποιότητας ζωής Ποντοκώμης
Association amateur fishermen Pontokomis Σύλλογος ερασιτεχνών ψαράδων Ποντοκώμης
Athletic Union Demetrius Ypsilanti Pontokomis Αθλητική Ένωση Δημητρίου Υψηλάντη Ποντοκώμης

Populated places in Kozani (regional unit)